Robert Paul Raymond Gillon (10 December 1884 – 25 July 1972) was a Belgian lawyer and liberal politician.

He was a member of the municipal council of Kortrijk, member of the provincial council of West Flanders, three times President of the Belgian Senate (26 April 1939 - 11 November 1947, 8 November 1949 - 27 April 1950 and 5 May 1954 - 24 June 1958) and later became Minister of State in 1945.

See also
 Liberal Party
 Liberalism in Belgium

References
 Robert Gillon
 Van Molle, P., Het Belgisch parlement 1894-1969, Gent, Erasmus, 1969, p. 156-157.
 Verbeke, Gaby, Robert, Paul Gillon. Un libéral modéré mais non modérément libéral, in : De Leiegouw, XLIII, 2001, 1, pp. 19–47.
 Georgette, Ciselet, Robert Gillon, une figure du libéralisme, in : Revue Générale, Brussel, 1979, pp. 59–66.

|-

|-

1884 births
1972 deaths
Belgian Ministers of State
Presidents of the Senate (Belgium)